Marsin may refer to:

 Marsin (woreda), a district of Somali Region, Ethiopia
 Marsin, plural demonym for people from Marsa, Malta
 Daniel Marsin (born 1951), French politician
 Ferdinand de Marsin (1656–1706), French general and diplomat

See also
 Mersin, a city in Turkey